Maize mosaic virus (MMV) is a plant pathogenic virus of the family Rhabdoviridae.

External links
ICTVdB - The Universal Virus Database: Maize mosaic virus
Family Groups - The Baltimore Method

Nucleorhabdoviruses
Viral plant pathogens and diseases